The Edgar Allan Poe Award for Best Fact Crime, established in 1948, is presented to nonfiction hardcover, paperback, or electronic books about mystery. The category includes both true crime books, as well as books "detailing how to solve actual crimes."

The Edgar Allan Poe Award for Best Fact Crime winners are listed below.

Recipients

2000s

2010s

2020s

References

External links 
  at Edgar Awards

Awards established in 1948